Janeen Uzzell is an American global technology executive and CEO of the National Society of Black Engineers.

Early life and education 
Uzzell was born in Newark, New Jersey, and raised in Plainfield, New Jersey, where she attended Mount St. Mary Academy. She has cited her family as an inspiration for her education and career. Her father, Jay Uzzell, was a musician in the band The Corsairs, and her mother is Kate Uzzell. She earned a bachelor's degree in mechanical engineering from North Carolina A&T State University and an MBA from Fairleigh Dickinson University.

Career 
Uzzell joined General Electric in 2002, focusing on healthcare technologies. In 2016, Uzzell took over the Women in Technology programs at General Electric. Here she led the implementation of an ad campaign that showcased women engineers, including Mildred Dresselhaus.

In 2021, after working for the Wikimedia Foundation as COO, Uzzell became CEO of the National Society of Black Engineers.

Uzzell serves on the advisory boards for Mercy Ships and as an advisor to the Believers in Business Collegiate Organization of the InterVarsity Christian Fellowship.

Honors 

The Network Journal named Uzzell one of its "40 Under Forty Achievers" in 2005 and one of "25 Most Influential Black Women in Business" in 2016.
She has received the General Electric African-American Forum's Icon Leadership Award.

References 

Living people
Year of birth missing (living people)
African-American engineers
American Wikimedians
Fairleigh Dickinson University alumni
North Carolina A&T State University alumni
People from Newark, New Jersey
People from Plainfield, New Jersey
21st-century African-American people
Wikimedia Foundation staff members